Xicen is an under-construction station on Line 17 of the Shanghai Metro. It is a part of the west-extension project. Located at the south of G50 Huyu Expressway and between the Lianxi Highway and Peiya Road, it will serves as the western terminus of Line 17 when it is completed. The construction started on 28 June 2021.

The station is planned to be completed by late 2023.

References 

Railway stations in Shanghai
Shanghai Metro stations in Qingpu District
Line 17, Shanghai Metro